A beauty dish is a photographic lighting device that uses a parabolic reflector to distribute light towards a focal point. The light created is between that of a direct flash and a softbox, giving the image a wrapped, contrasted look, which adds a more dramatic effect.

Uses 
There are many uses for a beauty dish, but its basic function is to provide a focused source of light for photographers. The beauty dish is used in portrait and fashion photography, because it is the best modifier for concentrating light on a subject and creating a better image than other modifiers. Because the beauty dish wraps the light around the subject it gives the image a better contrast and highlights angles that other modifiers wouldn't be able to highlight, which is why most fashion photographers use them for their models.

In portrait photography, the beauty dish is used a lot more because of its ability to capture a more high quality version of the model's beauty. With the way the beauty dish creates certain shadows in the "portrait" of the model it basically sculpts the face of the model, so that her beauty is captured in a more unique and high-profile way.

The beauty dish is also used in sports photography, because of the same reasons it is used in portrait and fashion photography. The way the beauty dish reflects the light allows it to accentuate and highlight the muscles and textures of the model, which is very important when a photographer's goal is to make a model look as if they are athletic even when they may not be.

Different models and uses 
The beauty dish comes in many different forms and each one creates a different effect on the model/subject. A few different designs include:
Balcar/Alien Bees
Bowens
Broncolor Pulso
Elinchrom
Flashpoint
Photogenic
Although the designs do not vary all that much, the differences give photographers room to see what works best for them and for their models.

The different uses of the beauty dish are:
One light setup: This setup is the most typical for photographers. It allows them to focus the light about two to four feet away from the models forehead, so that they can capture the light in their eyes. Shadows will be created under the chin and in places photographers may not want, therefore they will use a reflector to bounce light back up to the models face and use black cards to block out anything coming from the sides of the models face. This was the light will only be focused on the model's face and shoulders causing everything to look more highlighted and defined.
Two light setup: A photographer will use the same technique as they would with a one light setup, however they will use a strobe light in place of a reflector. This gives the photographer more control over the light.
Place a sock or diffusion material over the beauty dish: This creates a softer light on the subjects face and make the skin look creamy rather than textured.
Put grid on to the beauty dish: This creates a spotlight like pattern on the subject's face, however if not used correctly it will look shadowy and not strike the face in the right way.

References

Photography equipment
Photographic lighting
Flash photography